Derrick Martin "Del" Newman (5 October 1930 –  10 August 2020) was a British conductor, orchestral arranger and music producer. His orchestral arrangements appeared on songs by many rock and pop artists from the 1960s to the 1990s, including Cat Stevens, Elton John, Carly Simon and Rod Stewart. His work also encompassed Hollywood film scores and West End musicals.

Early life
Newman was born Derrick Martin Morrow in London. His father was a doctor of West African descent, and his mother was an Irish nurse. He was adopted by the Newman family when he was a few months old. At the age of seven, he began learning to play the cello and the piano.

After serving with the Royal Navy, he studied music at university in Exeter and London and then at Trinity College of Music, where he chose to specialise in musical composition and conducting. He received tuition from composer Elizabeth Lutyens and conductor Antal Doráti, among others.

Career
Newman worked on guitarist Gordon Giltrap's self-titled 1968 album and subsequently provided string arrangements for Cat Stevens' Tea for the Tillerman (1970). In addition to working with Elton John, Carly Simon and Rod Stewart, he contributed orchestral arrangements to albums by Asha Puthli, Peter Frampton, Harry Nilsson, Paul Simon, Scott Walker, Donovan, 10cc, George Harrison, Brian Protheroe and many other artists throughout the 1970s.

Newman also conducted George Martin's orchestral score for Paul McCartney and Wings' theme song for the 1973 James Bond film Live and Let Die. Referring to Newman's sympathetic work on John's Goodbye Yellow Brick Road album, author James E. Perone likens the "fully integrated" aspect of their collaborations to that of Martin's musical arrangements for the Beatles. Among his projects as a record producer, Newman produced Scott Walker's 1973 album Stretch, which included his composition "Someone Who Cared". He also produced Asha Puthli's debut, self-titled solo album in 1973.

In the 2000s, Newman withdrew from recording to focus on teaching. His autobiography, A Touch from God: It's Only Rock & Roll, was published in 2010. In October 2015, he received a Gold Badge Award from the British Academy of Songwriters, Composers and Authors for his contribution to music in the United Kingdom. He died at the age of 89 on 10 August 2020 in Carmarthen, Wales.

References

External links

British music arrangers
English conductors (music)
British male conductors (music)
Musicians from London
English people of African descent
English people of Irish descent
20th-century Royal Navy personnel
British record producers
1930 births
2020 deaths
British autobiographers
Alumni of the University of Exeter
Alumni of Trinity College of Music
21st-century British conductors (music)
21st-century British male musicians
English adoptees
Eurovision Song Contest conductors